Sedan may refer to:

Transportation 
 Sedan (automobile), a type of passenger car
 Franklin Sedan, built by H. H. Franklin Manufacturing Company, Syracuse, New York
 Prince Sedan, built by Prince Motor Company from 1952 to 1957
 Sero Sedan, an electric microcar marketed by Sero Electric since 2019
 Aeronca Sedan, a light aircraft built by Aeronca Aircraft from 1948 to 1951
 Curtiss-Wright CW-15 Sedan, a 1930s American utility aircraft
 Luscombe 11 Sedan, a 1940s American utility aircraft
 Sedan station, a railway station in Sedan, Ardennes, France

Places

France
 Arrondissement of Sedan, Ardennes
 Principality of Sedan, an independent Protestant state in the Ardennes from 1424 to 1642
 Sedan, Ardennes, a commune

United States
 Sedan, Indiana, an unincorporated community
 Sedan, Iowa, an unincorporated community
 Sedan, Kansas, a city
 Sedan Township, Chautauqua County, Kansas
 Sedan, Michigan, a former community
 Sedan, Minnesota, a city
 Sedan, Montana, a census-designated place
 Sedan, Nebraska, an unincorporated community
 Sedan, New Mexico, an unincorporated community
 Sedan, Ohio, an unincorporated community
 Sedan, Oklahoma, an unincorporated community
 Sedan, West Virginia, an unincorporated community

Elsewhere
 Sedan, South Australia, a town
 Sədan, Azerbaijan, a village and municipality

Other uses 
 Sedan (nuclear test), a 1962 nuclear test in Nevada, United States
 Sedan Crater, created by the nuclear test
 Battle of Sedan, an 1870 Franco-Prussian War battle that resulted in the capture of Emperor Napoleon III
 Battle of Sedan (1940), a Second World War battle fought during the German invasion of France
 CS Sedan Ardennes, a football club in Sedan, France
 Sedan High School, Sedan, Kansas
 Rolfe Sedan (1896–1982), American actor

See also 
 Academy of Sedan, a Huguenot academy in Sedan in the Principality of Sedan, founded in 1579 and suppressed in 1681
 Litter (vehicle), or sedan chair, a human-powered, wheelless device for transport of persons
 Sadan (disambiguation)
 Sedano (disambiguation)
 Sudan (disambiguation)